Tritonoturris poppei is a species of sea snail, a marine gastropod mollusk in the family Raphitomidae.

Description
The length of the shell varies between 35mm and 45mm.

Distribution
This marine species occurs off the Philippines.

References

 Vera-Pelaez J.L. & Vega-Luz R. (1999) Tritonoturris poppei: a new species of the subfamily Daphnellinae (Gastropoda, Turridae) of the Visayas Sea (Philippines). Malakos [Revista de la Asociacion Malacologica Andaluza], Monografia 1: 1–7

External links
 
 Gastropods.com: Tritonoturris poppei

poppei
Gastropods described in 1999